X Marks Destination is a debut studio album from the British alternative dance band The Whip.

Reception
X Marks Destination was released on March 24, 2008 in the United Kingdom, and on March 3, 2009 in the United States.

Initial critical response to X Marks Destination was average. At Metacritic, which assigns a normalized rating out of 100 to reviews from mainstream critics, the album has received an average score of 59, based on 7 reviews.

Track listing

Standard UK edition
All songs by Bruce Carter and Danny Saville
 "Trash" – 6:20
 "Frustration" – 4:51
 "Fire" – 5:11
 "Save My Soul" – 5:09
 "Sirens" – 4:17
 "Divebomb" – 5:39
 "Blackout" – 6:10
 "Muzzle #1" – 4:50
 "Sister Siam" – 4:43
 "Dubsex" – 4:10

US iTunes release
Along with the 10 original tracks listed in the standard UK release, 6 remixes are added after the first-ten main tracks and all ten tracks have slight changes in time duration.
 "Trash" – 6:20
 "Frustration" – 4:51
 "Fire" – 5:11
 "Save My Soul" – 5:09
 "Sirens" – 4:18
 "Divebomb" – 5:38
 "Blackout" – 6:10
 "Muzzle #1" – 4:50
 "Sister Siam" – 4:43
 "Dubsex" – 4:07
 "Blackout (Shinichi Osawa Remix)" – 5:40
 "Muzzle #1 (Bloody Beetroots Remix)" - 4:06
 "Sister Siam (Bitchee Bitchee Ya Ya Ya Remix)" - 4:49
 "Trash (Crookers Remix)" - 6:01
 "Trash (South Central Remix)" - 5:43
 "Sister Siam (Justin Robertson Dub)" - 5:36

Charts

Personnel
 Jim Abbiss – producer
 Bruce Carter – engineer, group member
 Ian Dowling – assistant engineer
 Liam Howe – producer
 B.J. Ben Mason – assistant engineer
 Nathan Sudders – group member
 Fiona Daniel – group member
 Danny Saville – group member
 Damian Taylor – mixing
 Richard Wilkinson – engineer

References

External links
 

2008 albums
The Whip (band) albums
Albums produced by Jim Abbiss
Southern Fried Records albums
Razor & Tie albums